Máenach mac Fíngin (died 661) was a King of Munster from the Eóganacht Chaisil branch of the Eoganachta. He was the son of Fíngen mac Áedo Duib (died 618), a previous king. His mother was Mór Muman (died 636), daughter of Áed Bennán mac Crimthainn of the Loch Lein. He succeeded Cúán mac Amalgado as king in 641 The annals provide no details of his reign. His son Aillil was father of a later king of Munster Cormac mac Ailello (died  713).

Notes

See also
Kings of Munster

References

Annals of Innisfallen
Francis John Byrne, Irish Kings and High-Kings 
Book of Munster, Rev. Eugene O'Keeffe
Laud Synchronisms
The Chronology of the Irish Annals, Daniel P. McCarthy

External links
CELT: Corpus of Electronic Texts at University College Cork

661 deaths
Kings of Munster
7th-century Irish monarchs
People from County Tipperary
Year of birth unknown